Richard Suckle (born January 1969) is an American film producer. Suckle was one of several producers nominated for an Academy Award for Best Picture for the 2013 film American Hustle.

Suckle graduated from the New York University Gallatin School of Individualized Study in 1991.

Filmography

References

External links 
 

American film producers
Living people
Golden Globe Award-winning producers
New York University Gallatin School of Individualized Study alumni
1969 births